Tengku Ahmad Rithauddeen bin Tengku Ismail (24 January 1928 – 29 April 2022) was a Malaysian politician and barrister who formerly served as chairman of the UMNO disciplinary board. He previously served as Minister of Defence, 
Minister of International Trade and Industry and Minister of Foreign Affairs. He was Kota Bharu Member of Parliament for five terms before losing his seat in the 1990 General Election to the Semangat 46 candidate. He was a royal prince of the Kelatan Royal Family and a grandson of the last Sultan of Pattani, Sultan Abdul Kadir Kamarudin Syah. After the throne was overthrown by the Siamese, the Sultan of Pattani was exiled to Kelantan and married Tengku Kembang Petri Binti Sultan Ahmad. He was also among few Malaysians awarded the Grand Cordon of the Order of the Rising Sun from Japanese Emperor, credited with strengthening Malaysian-Japanese relationship. He was also vocal in Malaysian politics, voicing several issues in regards to the post-BN social concerns.

Death
Tengku Ahmad Rithauddeen died on 29 April 2022 at his residence in Jalan Duta, aged 94. He was buried at Bukit Kiara Muslim Cemetery in Kuala Lumpur.

Honours

Honours of Malaysia
  : 
  Commander of the Order of the Defender of the Realm (PMN) – Tan Sri (1991)
  :
Tengku Sri Mara Raja (1966)
 Commander of the Order of the Crown of Kelantan (PMK)
  :
  Knight Grand Commander of the Order of the Crown of Perlis (SPMP) – Dato' Seri (1976)
  :
  Grand Knight of the Order of Sultan Ahmad Shah of Pahang (SSAP) – Dato' Sri (1981)

Foreign Honour
  :
  Grand Cordon of the Order of the Rising Sun (2018)

References

External links
  Ensiklopedia Malaysia: Kronologi Tengku Ahmad Rithauddeen Ismail

1928 births
2022 deaths 
20th-century Malaysian politicians
21st-century Malaysian politicians
People from Kelantan
Malaysian Muslims
Malaysian people of Malay descent
Royal House of Kelantan
United Malays National Organisation politicians
Recipients of the Order of the Rising Sun
Defence ministers of Malaysia
Foreign ministers of Malaysia
Information ministers of Malaysia
Commanders of the Order of the Defender of the Realm